André Jungen (born 3 March 1968) is a Swiss cross-country skier. He competed in the men's 10 kilometre classical event at the 1992 Winter Olympics.

References

1968 births
Living people
Swiss male cross-country skiers
Olympic cross-country skiers of Switzerland
Cross-country skiers at the 1992 Winter Olympics
Place of birth missing (living people)
20th-century Swiss people